Street Trash is a 1987 American black comedy body horror film directed by J. Michael Muro (credited as Jim Muro). It won the Silver Raven at the Brussels International Festival of Fantasy Film. The film has acquired a status as a cult classic independent horror-comedy and is one of a number of films known as "melt movies".

Plot

The owner of a liquor store in Greenpoint, Brooklyn, New York City finds a case of cheap booze ("Tenafly Viper") in his basement. It is more than 60 years old and has gone bad, but he decides to sell it to the local hobos anyway. Unfortunately, anyone who drinks it melts away hideously. At the same time, two homeless brothers find different ways to cope with homelessness while they make their residence in a local junkyard while one employee, a female cashier and clerk, frequently tends to both of them. Meanwhile, an overzealous cop (Bill Chepil) is trying to get to the bottom of all the deaths, all the while trying to end the tyranny of a deranged Vietnam veteran named Bronson (Vic Noto), who has made his self-proclaimed "kingdom" at the junkyard with a group of homeless vets under his command as his personal henchmen.

The film is littered with darkly comedic deaths and injuries. It also contains the notorious "severed privates" scene where a group of homeless people play catch with the severed genitals of one of their number, as he futilely attempts to recover it.

Cast 

 Mike Lackey as Fred
 Bill Chepil as Bill the cop
 Vic Noto as Bronson 
 Mark Sferrazza as Kevin
 Jane Arakawa as Wendy 
 Nicole Potter as Winette, Bronson's girlfriend
 R. L. Ryan as Frank Schnizer
 Clarence Jarmon as Burt
 Bernard Perlman as Wizzy
 Miriam Zucker as Drunken Wench
 M. D'Jango Krunch as Ed the liquor store owner
 Tony Darrow as Nick Duran the Italian mobster
 Ian Bernardo as Obnoxious kid
 James Lorinz as Italian restaurant doorman

Production

Roy Frumkes wrote the screenplay. In an NBR profile he later said: "I wrote it to democratically offend every group on the planet, and as a result the youth market embraced it as a renegade work, and it played midnight shows." The film was based on a ten-minute student film directed by J. Michael Muro and starring Mike Lackey. Bryan Singer worked on the film as a grip.

Deleted scenes include a junkyard dance sequence and a sub-plot involving the relationship between Fred (Mike Lackey) and Bronson; these sequences are included in the documentary Meltdown Memoirs.

Release
The film was given a limited release theatrically in the United States by Lightning Pictures in June 1987. They also released the film on VHS the same year.

In 2005, Synapse Films marketed an all-new, digitally remastered version of the film.  Included with the DVD were sticker-type "labels" of the Viper wine featured in the film. In 2006, a second release by Synapse Films was announced, featuring the documentary Meltdown Memoirs by writer Roy Frumkes. The feature includes interviews with most of the surviving cast and crew with the exception of Jane Arakawa. It also contains the original 16mm short version of Street Trash.

In 2010, Arrow Video released a two-DVD set in the UK featuring the documentary Meltdown Memoirs along with a previously unavailable featurette with Jane Arakawa and the booklet 42nd Street Trash: The Making of the Melt written by Calum Waddell. Since then, the movie has been released also on Blu-ray in numerous countries.

Reception

Street Trash received little critical attention upon its initial release. The film holds a 67% rating on review site Rotten Tomatoes, where critic Walter Goodman of The New York Times said of it, "It claims no redeeming social value, and you don't have to be a Supreme Court nominee to question whether the Founders could have foreseen anything like it when they wrote the First Amendment." Other reviewers on the platform consider Street Trash a crude but overlooked dark humour pioneer in the splatter film genre.

The film has since gained a cult following among horror fans on the internet, owing in part to the minor character role of an obnoxious kid being played by infamous contestant Ian Bernardo from reality TV shows So You Think You Can Dance? and American Idol, both of which he lost due to rude and bizarre behaviour, making him an iconic meme on YouTube. Chuck Bowen of Slant Magazine said (of the Street Trash Blu-ray), "Street Trash is a cult item that’s almost earnestly eager to offend, which is admittedly an odd thing to say about a film that features a prolonged scene in which a group of bums play hot potato with a man’s severed penis. It’s a 1980s American film, like Repo Man, that celebrates the proletariat’s resigned disenfranchisement as a badge of aesthetic honour." He went on to describe the film as a satire of the 1980's American political hierarchy, and rated it 4/5 stars. Review platform AllHorror said of Street Trash that they "personally loved it... the title might lead you to think its purpose is to shine a light on how trashy the homeless are, but it actually succeeds in showing how trashy everyone is. Brian Eggert of Deep Focus Review criticized the film's attempts at shock value, saying, "around the time an unsuspecting bum inadvertently urinates on another, causing the pee-victim to chop off the offending man’s penis, while at the same moment, not far away, a would-be rapist engages in necrophilia with the corpse of a gang-rape victim, I decided Street Trash wasn’t my cup of tea... all I saw was a desperate attempt to get a reaction. My response to the film is the same with a bully or noisy child; I just roll my eyes and ignore it."

References

External links
 
 Synapse films page

1987 films
1987 horror films
1980s comedy horror films
1987 independent films
American comedy horror films
Films about rape
Films set in New York City
Films shot in New York City
American splatter films
Features based on short films
Poisoning in film
1987 directorial debut films
American black comedy films
American body horror films
1980s English-language films
1980s American films